soundsUP Records is an independent record label founded in 2013 in Berlin, Germany. The label specifies on releasing vinyl records only, mostly specializing on rock music.

Music 
More recent signings include names such as Viza, Blindead, Poets Of The Fall, Abney Park and The Chronicles of Israfel.

See also 
 List of record labels

References

External links 
 soundsUP official website
 soundsUP Records on Discogs
 soundsUP Records Twitter
 soundsUP Records Facebook

German independent record labels
Record labels established in 2013